Greazee Soul is an album by Billy Preston which was released by Soul City Records in the UK in 1969. It is a re-release of his debut album, 16 Yr. Old Soul, which was released by Derby Records in June 1963. All tracks produced by J.W. Alexander and Fred Smith.

A CD version was released in 2013 by ABKCO and Real Gone Music (RGM-0195). The CD contains two bonus tracks: "Sweet Thing" and "Win Your Love for Me."

Side one
 "Greazee Parts 1 & 2" 
 "Lost & Looking"   (shown as "Lost and A'Lookin'" on original release)
 "I Can't Stop Loving You" 
 "Born To Love" ("Born To Lose")
 "Ain't That Love"

Side two
 "Bring It Home To Me" ("Bring It On Home To Me")
 "God Bless The Child" 
 "Pretty Little Girl" 
 "In The Spring" 
 "Good News"

1969 albums
Billy Preston albums
Albums produced by Billy Preston